Tana River is a left tributary of the Chitina River in south-central Alaska. 
Tana River is fed by the Tana Glacier.  It flows initially along its eastern edge, later below its glacier tongue in a predominantly northern direction.  The West Fork River flows left into the river.  The river valley of the Tana River forms the dividing line between the Saint Elias Mountains in the east and the Chugach Mountains in the west.  The Tana River finally flows into the Chitina River after 60 km.

West Fork Tana River
The West Fork Tana River is a left tributary of the Tana River.  It is fed by the Tana Glacier tongue of the Bremner Glacier.  The West Fork Tana River flows in an easterly direction and flows into the Tana River after 24 km.

See also
List of rivers of Alaska
Wrangell–St. Elias National Park and Preserve

References

Rivers of Alaska
Rivers of Unorganized Borough, Alaska